This is a list of episodes of The Rose of Versailles anime series, based on the manga of the same title by Riyoko Ikeda. The anime was directed by Tadao Nagahama and Osamu Dezaki. The series consists of 40 episodes and 1 recapitulation. The anime was first aired in Japan on the channel Nippon Television from 10 October 1979 to 3 September 1980. The series has been re-released on laserdisc. It was released on DVD in 2005 as part of a revival of The Rose of Versailles coinciding with the 250th anniversary of Marie Antoinette's birth.

The production staff included the most recognized animation professionals then, who contributed in the making of the 40 episodes of the anime. In spite of the difficulties they had to go through, the staff could continue with their work and took advantage of these problems. The most important of said incidents was the change of direction at the middle of the project, which marked a notable difference between the first half of the anime (directed by Tadao Nagahama) and the second one (directed by Osamu Dezaki). Shingo Araki was the animation director and co-character designer along with Akio Sugino and Michi Himeno. Koji Makaino was in charge of the soundtrack.

Episode list

References 

Episodes
Rose of Versailles, The